Georges Rousse (born July 28, 1947) is a French photographer, painter, and installation artist. He currently lives in Paris.

Early life
When he was 9 years old, he received a Kodak Brownie camera as a Christmas gift, inspiring his passion for photography. While attending medical school in Nice, he decided to study professional photography and printing techniques. He subsequently opened his own studio dedicated to architectural photography.

Artwork
Rousse converts abandoned or soon-to-be-demolished buildings into visions of color and shape. 
Since his first exhibition in 1981 at the Galerie de France in Paris, Rousse has continued creating installations and photographs around the globe.  His work has been exhibited at the Grand Palais, Hirshhorn Museum, and the National Art Museum of China, among others. In 1988, he received the International Center of Photography Award.  In 2008, Georges Rousse succeeded Sol LeWitt as an associate member of the Royal Academy of Science, Letters and Fine Arts of Belgium.

Museum collections
 J. Paul Getty Museum, Los Angeles
 Louvre, Paris
 Solomon R. Guggenheim Museum, New York
 Brooklyn Museum, New York
 Museum of Contemporary Art San Diego, La Jolla, CA
 Musée d'Art Moderne de Paris, Paris
 Mumok, Vienna
 Menil Collection, Houston, TX
 LaSalle Bank Photography Collection, Chicago

References

Living people
1947 births
20th-century French photographers